Chalelu Chelbianlu (also Romanized as Chālelū Chelbīānlū; also known as Chālelū Bārlānlū and Chāllū Bārānlū) is a village in Quri Chay-ye Gharbi Rural District, Saraju District, Maragheh County, East Azerbaijan Province, Iran. At the 2006 census, its population was 161, in 20 families.

References 

Towns and villages in Maragheh County